The women's coxless pair competition at the 2016 Summer Olympics in Rio de Janeiro were held on 6–11 August at the Lagoon Rodrigo de Freitas.

The medals for the competition were presented by Ivo Ferriani, Italy, member of the International Olympic Committee, and the gifts were presented by Mike Williams, Great Britain, Treasurer of the International Rowing Federation.

Results

Heats
First three of each heat qualify to the semifinals, remainder goes to the repechage.

Heat 1

Heat 2

Heat 3

Repechage
First three of  heat qualify to the semifinals, remainder goes to Final C.

Repechage 1

Semifinal
First three of each heat qualify to the Final A, remainder goes to Final B.

Semifinal 1

Semifinal 2

Finals

Final C

Final B

Final A

References

Women
Women's events at the 2016 Summer Olympics